La Polar is the fourth largest retail company in Chile, behind Falabella, Paris S.A and Ripley S.A.

The company has 43 stores, being 38 in Chile and 5 in Colombia and
offers various products, such as clothing, accessories, sporting goods, beauty products, gifts, infant products, electronics, furniture, furnishings, and household products. It also provides a range of services comprising the credit cards, general and life insurance, and extended warranty durable products.

Renegotiated customers' debt without consent
On 17 June 2011 Chile's Superintendencia de Valores y Seguros (securities regulator) indefinitely suspended trading in Empresas La Polar SA pending an investigation after La Polar announced it would have to provision an additional $430 million due to irregularities in its store-credit department.

References

External links
 "Llegar y llevar", el escándalo de los almacenes chilenos La Polar in Spanish newspaper El País on 20 June 2011, Retrieved 20 June 2011 in Spanish language

Department stores of Chile
1920 establishments in Chile